The 2022–23 season is the 91st season in the existence of Wigan Athletic Football Club and the club's first season back in the Championship since the 2019–20 season following promotion last season. In addition to the league, they will also compete in the 2022–23 FA Cup and the 2022–23 EFL Cup.

On 11 March 2023, Wigan released a statement that they have a delay in meeting wage obligations due to liquidity issues and the EFL is aware of the situation.

Transfers

In

Out

Loans in

Loans out

Pre-season and friendlies
On June 10, the Latics announced their initial pre-season schedule, which included a training camp in Spain. Two home friendlies, against Liverpool XI and Sheffield Wednesday was also added to the schedule. On 9 July, Wigan played an unannounced friendly against their main rivals Bolton Wanderers.

Competitions

Overall record

Championship

On 23 June, the league fixtures were announced.

League table

Results summary

Results by round

FA Cup

The Latics were drawn away to Luton Town in the third round.

EFL Cup

Wigan were drawn away to Fleetwood Town in the first round.

Statistics

Players with names in italics and marked * were on loan from another club for the whole of their season with Wigan Athletic.

         

|-
!colspan=14|Players out on loan:

|}

Goals record

Disciplinary record

References

Wigan Athletic F.C. seasons
Wigan Athletic
English football clubs 2022–23 season